Khalil Tahir Sandhu is a Pakistani politician  who was a Member of the Provincial Assembly of the Punjab from 2008 to May 2018.

Early life and education
He was born on 23 May 1967 in Toba Tek Singh.

He graduated from Government College University, Faisalabad in 1987. He received the degree of Bachelor of Education from Government Education College, Faisalabad in 1989 and the degree of Bachelor of Laws from Punjab University Law College in 1994.

Political career
He was elected to the Provincial Assembly of the Punjab as a candidate of Pakistan Muslim League (N) (PML-N) on reserved seat for minorities in 2008 Pakistani general election. He served as Parliamentary Secretary for Human Rights and Minorities Affairs from 2008 to 2013.

He was re-elected to the Provincial Assembly of the Punjab as a candidate of PML-N on reserved seat for minorities in 2013 Pakistani general election. In June 2013, he was inducted into the provincial cabinet of Chief Minister Shahbaz Sharif and was made Provincial Minister of Punjab for human rights and minorities with additional portfolio of health. He remained Minister for health until November 2013.

References

Living people
1967 births
Punjab MPAs 2008–2013
Punjab MPAs 2013–2018
Pakistan Muslim League (N) MPAs (Punjab)
Punjab MPAs 2018–2023
Government College University Faisalabad alumni